Robert Bassler (September 26, 1903 – November 8, 1975) was an American film and television producer.

References

External links
 

1903 births
1975 deaths
People from Washington, D.C.
American film producers
20th-century American businesspeople